Egisto can refer to:

Aegisthus, figure in Greek mythology
L'Egisto, 1643 opera by Francesco Cavalli
Chi soffre, speri (also known as L'Egisto), 1637 opera by Virgilio Mazzocchi 
22401 Egisto, a minor planet